Una Christina Ledingham (2 January 1900 – 19 November 1965) was a British physician known for her studies of diabetes in pregnancy.

Early life and education
Ledingham was born Una Christina Garvin to parents Christina and James. She attended South Hampstead High School and London School of Medicine for Women, then went on to the University of London, where she received her MBBS degree in 1923. She held house posts at the Brompton, the Royal Free and Royal Northern Hospitals until 1925, and in the same year she married John Ledingham, with whom she had one son and one daughter. She earned her MD in 1927, from the London School of Medicine for Women; from 1925 to 1931, she was a staff registrar there and a became staff physician in 1931. At the Hampstead General Hospital and at the Marie Curie Hospital she developed a special interest in diabetes, and was an expert on the problems of the pregnant diabetic woman.

Career
Ledingham was on staff at the Marie Curie Hospital and Hampstead General Hospital from 1931 until the end of her career.  There, she studied diabetes in pregnancy. She became an expert on the problems of diabetic and pregnant women. During World War 2, she managed her husband's medical practice while keeping up with her own medical work.

Honours and legacy
Ledingham belonged to several groups. These included the board of governors of the Royal Free Hospital (from 1957 to 1960) and the Royal College of Physicians, where she was elected a fellow in 1942.

References

British women scientists
British women medical doctors
1900 births
1965 deaths
Alumni of the London School of Medicine for Women